Anacaea or Anakaia was a deme of ancient Attica, of the phyle of Hippothontis, sending three delegates to the Athenian Boule. 

Its site is tentatively located near modern Mygdaleza.

References

Populated places in ancient Attica
Former populated places in Greece
Demoi